Gujarat Giants (formerly known as Gujarat Fortunegiants) is a men's kabaddi team based in Ahmedabad, Gujarat that plays in the Pro Kabaddi League. The team is currently led by Chandran Ranjith and coached by Ram mehar Singh. The team is owned by Adani Wilmar Ltd. The Giants play their home matches at The Arena by TransStadia. They reached the final in both of their attempts in 2017 and 2018, finishing runner's up on both occasions to the Patna Pirates and Bengaluru Bulls respectively.

Team identity

Name
Gujarat Giants was known as Gujarat Fortune Giants before season 8. Fortune word represented Adani's Adani Wilmar (Fortune) Brand.

Logo and mascot
The logo of Gujarat Giant has an illustration of a muscular man.  This is the Tilak on the forehead of the mascot.  Also he wears red dhoti.  This muscular man exemplifies Gujarat Giants' core values of Power, strength and vigor, much needed in the game of Kabaddi. The logo also captures the action and emotion of an energetic and fierce man.

Anthem
"Ghan Ghan Ghan Ghaat, Garjega Gujarat" is the current anthem. It was sung by Sukhvinder Singh and Gujarati Folk singer Kirtidan Gadhvi, Composed by Musical duo Salim–Sulaiman.

Current squad

Head coach record

Seasons

Season V

Season VI

Season VII

Season VIII

Season IX

Records

Overall results Pro Kabbaddi season

By opposition
''Note: Table lists in alphabetical order.

Sponsors

References

External links 

Pro Kabaddi League teams
Sport in Ahmedabad
Sport in Pune
2014 establishments in Gujarat
Kabaddi clubs established in 2014
Adani Group